The Ikitsuki Bridge is a continuous truss bridge that connects Ikitsuki to Hirado Island. It is the longest continuous truss bridge in the world.

History 
The bridge allows automobile access from Ikitsuki to Hirado and the rest of Japan. Previously, the only option to travel off Ikitsuki was by ferry to various ports in Kyūshū.

See also
List of longest continuous truss bridge spans
Truss bridge

References

Continuous truss bridges
Bridges completed in 1991
Bridges in Japan
1991 establishments in Japan
Steel bridges